Severin Blindenbacher (born March 15, 1983 in Zurich, Switzerland) is a Swiss former professional ice hockey defenceman who last played with as an alternate captain for the ZSC Lions of the National League (NL). He had also played for EHC Kloten of the NL and Färjestad BK of the Swedish Hockey League (SHL).

Internationally Blindenbacher played for the Swiss national team at multiple World Championships, and three Winter Olympics.

Playing career
A junior with the Swiss National League A club, Kloten Flyers, Blindenbacher was drafted 273rd overall in the 2001 NHL Entry Draft by the Phoenix Coyotes. Unsigned by the Coyotes, Severin remained with the Flyers for the first five years of his professional career before joining fellow NLA club, ZSC Lions. In his fourth year with the Lions, Blindenbacher broke out offensively scoring 13 goals for 35 points in 47 games.

He left the NLA prior to the 2009–10 season and signed with the Swedish club, Färjestads BK of the Elitserien. In his one season with Färjestads, Severin led defensemen in scoring with 8 goals and 19 points in 48 games.

On July 1, 2010, Blindenbacher signed as a free agent to a one-year entry level contract with the Dallas Stars of the National Hockey League (NHL). He spent the 2010–11 season with their American Hockey League (AHL) affiliate, Texas Stars, before returning to ZSC Lions.

On April 29, 2016, he agreed to a three-year contract extension worth CHF 2.7 million with the Lions.

Career statistics

Regular season and playoffs

International

 *All statistics taken from elitepropects.com

References

External links
 

1983 births
Living people
Arizona Coyotes draft picks
Färjestad BK players
Ice hockey players at the 2006 Winter Olympics
Ice hockey players at the 2010 Winter Olympics
Ice hockey players at the 2014 Winter Olympics
EHC Kloten players
Olympic ice hockey players of Switzerland
Ice hockey people from Zürich
Swiss ice hockey defencemen
Texas Stars players
ZSC Lions players